Masur-e Abi (also Romanized as Māsūr-e Ābī; also known as Māsūr) is a village in Dorud Rural District, in the Central District of Dorud County, Lorestan Province, Iran. At the 2006 census, its population was 66, in 15 families.

References 

Towns and villages in Dorud County